Sergio Arau (born Alfonso Sergio Arau Corona; November 14, 1951), also known as "El Uyuyuy", is a Mexican musician, singer-songwriter, screenwriter, film director, film producer, and music producer.

Life
He is the son of film director Alfonso Arau.

Arau was a founding member of the band Botellita de Jerez which was formed in 1983 and created the style Guacarrock. He got his start in Music at the Avandaro Festival in 1971 with his family band "La Ley de Herodes". As a solo artist, he has released three studio albums. Arau has directed music videos, animations, and film.

He is best known as a film director for the films A Day Without a Mexican and Naco es Chido.

In 2015 he founded the band Los Heavy Mex with members from the Mexican/American band Rusty Eye.

References

External links

1951 births
Living people
Mexican film directors
Mexican male screenwriters
Mexican male singer-songwriters
Mexican film producers
Mexican rock musicians
Mexican record producers
Alternative rock musicians
Mexican painters